PFC Litex Lovech II or Litex Lovech 2 was a Bulgarian football team based in Lovech. Founded in 2015, it was the reserve team of PFC Litex Lovech, and completed one season in B Group, the second level of Bulgarian football.

History

Foundation
At the beginning of 2015 BFUnion discussed the idea of teams from A Group having a second team in B Group or lower. Ludogorets Razgrad, Litex Lovech, Levski Sofia, CSKA Sofia, Cherno More Varna and Botev Plovdiv showed interest in having a team in B group. At the beginning of June 2015, BFU announced that only Litex and Ludogorets had applied to have their 2nd teams in B Group. Later Litex II and Ludogorets II were added in B Group for the 2015–16 season.

2015–16 season
After the administrative relegation to the B Group on 21 January 2016 (for the 2016–17 season) of Litex Lovech, the 2nd team will be relegated to the V Group for the 2016–17 season, but the team will complete the season in the B Group until end of 2015–16 season and as the first team won't complete in A Group, most of the players could complete for the 2nd team and play for the first team in the Bulgarian Cup since Litex Lovech is part of semifinals.

Managers

Past seasons

Most matches

B Group

References

External links
Official website

Litex
Association football clubs established in 2015
2015 establishments in Bulgaria
Association football clubs disestablished in 2016
Litex II
II